Liane Marie Cartman is a fictional character in the adult animated television series South Park. She is the single mother of main character Eric, who raises him in the fictional town of South Park, Colorado. Liane is considered one of the more prominent parents of all the South Park parents, as she makes many appearances throughout the series.

Liane first appeared in the series' first episode "Cartman Gets an Anal Probe", which premiered on Comedy Central on August 13, 1997. Though the first episode, as well as the "Spirit of Christmas" shorts made by series co-creators Trey Parker and Matt Stone, were animated with construction paper through stop motion, after the series second episode, "Weight Gain 4000", she is animated with a computer and rendered to mimic that style. Liane is named after co-creator Parker's ex-fiancé Liane Adamo, who broke up after he discovered she had an affair. She was originally voiced by Mary Kay Bergman, and later Eliza Schneider, and currently April Stewart. 

As she frequently appears in the series, Liane has also appeared in many South Park-related media. This includes appearing in the 1999 film South Park: Bigger, Longer, & Uncut, as well video games like South Park: The Stick of Truth and South Park: Phone Destroyer.

Character
She is named after Liane Adamo, the ex-fiancé of series co-creator Trey Parker, who broke up after Adamo committed infidelities against Parker. Like many of the other characters in the series, Liane consists of simple geometric shapes. She has long brown hair, usually tied in a bun, and wears a turquoise sweater and brick red trousers; her outfit is quite similar to her son's, with her sweater having the color as his knit cap, and her trousers having the same color as his coat. Liane also has the average height of an adult female character in the series.

In the earlier seasons, Liane was frequently shown giving people of the town of South Park her baking, mostly cookies. Coincidentally, there is a picture with her and her son at Mount Rushmore where Liane is holding a plate of cookies. One notable example of her generosity has to be in "Cartman's Mom is a Dirty Slut", where she gives a plate of cookies to Officer Barbrady at the Drunken Barn Dance.

Yet, like Eric, she has numerous implications that, like her son, is racist and anti-Semitic; usually in the earlier seasons, Cartman quotes his mother for use of politically incorrect or offensive statements. For example, in Good Times With Weapons, Eric claimed that he and Liane went to see the movie The Passion for an argument proving that Jews are sneaky liars.

Earlier in the series, Liane used to be sexually active and frequently pursues it. She occasionally worked as a crack whore, and appeared in "Crack Whore Magazine" in Pinkeye, for which she was then young and needed money. Liane also acted in German scheisse movies. Then, she had no problems with sexual relations with anybody in the town, whereas invites any stranger to her home. But it was hinted that in "Cartman's Mom is Still a Dirty Slut" that she had intercourse with a few citizens of South Park. In recent seasons she changed her character and seems to be more responsible with Eric.

Hermaphrodite and Parentage
In "Cartman's Mom is a Dirty Slut", it was stated that Liane was a hermaphrodite, meaning she had both male and female sexual organs, which revealed that Liane is not Cartman's mother but rather his father. It was also stated that in the events of the episode, years ago at the Drunken Barn Dance, Liane proceeded to have sex with numerous men and women. But in 200, Mr. Garrison and Mr. Hat revealed to Cartman that the paternity test results have tampered with a fabrication. In "201", it turns out that Liane isn't a hermaphrodite, as it was a lie told by the citizens of South Park in order to protect the Denver Broncos. 

Cartman's father wasn't told until "201" when Scott Tenorman captures him and reveals that the former's real father was Scott's father Jack Tenorman, who Cartman had arranged to be killed, eventually made into chili, and fed to Scott, whereas played for the Broncos.

Family
''
Liane is the single mother of 10-year-old Eric. She has a kind and soft voice and shows great deference towards him. Like her son, she denies Eric's obesity, and also says he's big-boned; Liane likes to give him food smothered between normal and junk food, notably in "Cartman Gets an Anal Probe", she gave him a "chocolate chicken pot pie with icing on top". Though Eric and Liane share a great bond with each other, in later seasons, she feels stern about his poor actions, which resolves further in later episodes. Notably, in "PC Principal Final Justice", Cartman and Liane argue, until the former pulls out a gun, in which the latter also responds in the same way, and gets Cartman to listen to her. Liane has also felt tired of her son misbehaving in recent episodes, from being embarrassed at Eric for not getting his shot to her losing her job and moving from their original home to Coney Island Hotdog.

Liane and Eric have an extended family, who was first shown in "Merry Christmas, Charlie Manson!". The two, along with her son's other friends, who are Stan, Kyle, and Kenny, are in Nebraska to visit Liane's relatives - most of which are similar to Cartman, with the same speech impediments, as well as catchphrases such as "Respect Mah Authoritah!" or "Kickass!". Liane's relatives are parents Harold and Mabel (who died prior to Cartmanland), brothers Howard and Stinky, and grandmother Florence. She also has a sister-in-law named Lisa, two nephews named Elvin and Fred, and a niece named Alexandra. Her family, as well as other members of the Cartman family (who've also appeared in the episode) makes an appearance in the beginning of Cartmanland at Mabel's funeral.

References

Fictional characters from Colorado
Television characters introduced in 1997
Fictional androgynes
Fictional pornographic film actors
Fictional prostitutes
LGBT characters in animation
Fictional bisexual females
South Park characters
Animated characters introduced in 1997